Miloš Živanović (born 24 July 1988) is a Serbian professional footballer who plays as a forward for Mladenovac.

Club career
A product of the Partizan youth system, Živanović spent three seasons at Hajduk Kula between 2008 and 2011, making 84 appearances and scoring 17 goals in the Serbian SuperLiga. He later played for numerous clubs in the top flight and lower divisions.

International career
At international level, Živanović represented Serbia at the 2007 UEFA European Under-19 Championship. He was also capped twice for the under-21 team from 2009 to 2010.

Notes

References

External links
 
 
 

Association football forwards
Expatriate footballers in Bosnia and Herzegovina
FK Borac Čačak players
FK BSK Borča players
FK Dinamo Vranje players
FK Hajduk Kula players
FK Inđija players
FK Jedinstvo Surčin players
FK Jedinstvo Užice players
FK Mačva Šabac players
FK Mladost Velika Obarska players
FK Partizan players
FK Radnički Pirot players
FK Sloboda Užice players
FK Teleoptik players
Footballers from Belgrade
OFK Mladenovac players
Serbia and Montenegro footballers
Serbia under-21 international footballers
Serbia youth international footballers
Serbian expatriate footballers
Serbian expatriate sportspeople in Bosnia and Herzegovina
Serbian First League players
Serbian footballers
Serbian SuperLiga players
1988 births
Living people